Mauritius is a masculine given name. Bearers include:

 Saint Maurice or Mauritius (died c. 287), Egyptian leader of the Theban Legion martyred along with his entire unit for refusing to attack fellow Christians
 Mauritius II of Trier, Bishop of Trier
 Mauritius Ferber (1471–1537), Roman Catholic Prince-Bishop of Warmia
 Mauritius Lowe (1746–1793), British painter and engraver
 Mauritius Ngupita (born 2000), Namibian cricketer
 Mauritius Vogt, monastic name of Johann Georg Vogt (1669–1730), German geographer, cartographer, musician, historian and member of the Cistercian Order
 Mauritius Wilde (born 1965), German Benedictine monk, priest, professor, podcaster, spiritual director and author

See also
 Maurice (name)

Masculine given names